Kim Kyong-il (born 10 October 1970) is a North Korean former footballer. He represented North Korea on at least thirty-one occasions between 1988 and 1993, scoring three times.

Career statistics

International

International goals
Scores and results list North Korea's goal tally first, score column indicates score after each North Korea goal.

References

External links
Kim Kyong-il at 11v11
Kim Kyong-il at 11v11

1970 births
Living people
North Korean footballers
North Korea international footballers
Association football defenders
Footballers at the 1990 Asian Games
1992 AFC Asian Cup players
Asian Games competitors for North Korea